Terence Betts is the name of:

 Terry Betts (born 1943), English speedway rider
 Terence Betts (rugby) (1926–2017), Australian rugby union player